Royal Air Force Oulton or more simply RAF Oulton is a former Royal Air Force satellite airfield located  west of Aylsham, Norfolk and  northwest of Norwich, Norfolk, England.

The airfield was built over 1939 and 1940 as a bomber airfield with T2 type hangars and grass runways, the facility operating as a satellite airfield of nearby RAF Horsham St. Faith between July 1940 and September 1942 after which it operated as a satellite airfield of RAF Swanton Morley.

History

In September 1943, Oulton was transferred from 2 Group to 3 Group and closed to flying for re-construction as a heavy bomber base with concrete runways, taxiways and parking areas.  The work was completed in April 1944 and the airfield transferred to No. 100 Group RAF. Flying operations ceased at the end of July 1945, after which it was taken over by RAF Maintenance Command which used it to store de Havilland Mosquitos until November 1947.

Additional Units
 No. 18 Heavy Glider Maintenance Section
 No. 274 Maintenance Unit RAF
 No. 1428 (Ferry Training) Flight RAF
 No. 2873 Squadron RAF Regiment
 No. 2874 Squadron RAF Regiment

Current use

The site is now farmland.

Museum
The RAF Oulton Museum is housed on the Blickling Hall estate, belonging to the National Trust.

See also
 List of former Royal Air Force stations

References

Citations

Bibliography
Bowyer, J.F. Action Stations 1: Wartime military airfields of East Anglia 1939. Wellingborough, UK: Patrick Stephens Limited, Second edition, 1990. .
"Your Questions Answered...Oulton, Norfolk". Air Pictorial, October 1967. p. 373.

External links

Royal Air Force stations in Norfolk
Royal Air Force stations of World War II in the United Kingdom